Bruno Tiago Conceição Bernardo, known as Bruno Sapo (born 3 March 1986) is a Portuguese football player who plays for Vitória Setúbal.

Club career
He made his professional debut in the Segunda Liga for Cova da Piedade on 14 August 2016 in a game against Leixoes.

References

External links

1986 births
Footballers from Lisbon
Living people
Portuguese footballers
S.U. Sintrense players
S.C. Farense players
C.D.R. Quarteirense players
Louletano D.C. players
GS Loures players
C.D. Cova da Piedade players
Vitória F.C. players
Liga Portugal 2 players
Campeonato de Portugal (league) players
Association football defenders